Dorin Bogdan Zotincă (born 13 April 1971) is a Romanian former footballer who played as a defender and midfielder. His brother, Alex Zotincă was also a footballer.

International career
Dorin Zotincă played two friendly games at international level for Romania.

References

1971 births
Living people
Romanian footballers
Romania international footballers
Association football midfielders
Liga I players
Liga II players
FC Inter Sibiu players
FC Dinamo București players
FC Universitatea Cluj players
FC Progresul București players
CSM Reșița players
Sportspeople from Brașov